Malek Shafi’i is a film director, producer, festival organiser, and human rights activist from Afghanistan.

Biography 
Malek Shafi’i is the Founder and Executive Director of the "Afghanistan International Human Rights Film Festival" (AIHRFF). He is a film documentary maker based in Kabul and has been working in the country and abroad. Shafi’i completed his education at Baagh Ferdaws Filmmaking Center in Tehran and Sociology studies in Kateb University in Kabul. Additionally, he attended film production, arts management courses and studies in the Netherlands and the United States. Malek returned to Afghanistan in 2006, after 20 years of exile, and founded "Bashgahe Cinema - Afghanistan Cinema Club – BASA Film", a non-profit organization that promotes cultural and arts development projects with a focus on training and producing the work of emerging Afghan filmmakers in Afghanistan. Other cultural projects where he has collaborated extensively include the Kabul International Documentary and Short Film Festival, and Second Take Film Festival 2008, a film festival that juxtaposes the theme of gender, cinema and society in Afghanistan.

Malek has also acted as a Senior Media and Communication Advisor for RTA (Radio Television of Afghanistan), working with different NGO's and international organizations as well as with the United Nations system of agencies in Afghanistan, implementing film and media projects on the promotion of the Universal Declaration of Human Rights. He has directed and produced more than 30 films. Some of them have won international film awards from different international film festivals in previous years. Shafi’i was a Jury member of the Tolo TV Film Festival, Kabul Film Festival, Amnesty Award of CPH-DOX, ADB (Asian Development Bank) "My View" video competition and in the category judge of BANFF. Malek is a 2012 ArtsLink Residencies program Fellow in Visual Arts and Media, a program that engages communities through international arts partnerships. 
In order to use the power of traditional and new media to influence filmmaking, impact human rights and to connect Afghanistan's current situation to other human rights issues from other parts of the world. And with the need to create a cinematography stage to help Afghan filmmakers showcase their talent and expertise to Afghan filmgoers and the international audience living in Afghanistan, Malek joined creative forces with Afghan documentary filmmaker and human rights activist Diana Saqeb and Multimedia Producer and Arts Director Hassan Zakizadeh in 2011 to launch the first edition of Afghanistan Human Rights Film Festival in Kabul, as well as other provinces of the country, with the main objective of bringing human rights stories to a broader audience and to the real Afghan context.

Movies Selected 

Since 1999 he made more than 30 Documentary and Short Fiction films outside and inside Afghanistan, with well-known examples listed below.
2012	Bamyan the land of wonders / 25m / documentary for AKF (Aga Khan Foundation)
2009	Savings Groups / 20m / documentary for AKF (Aga Khan Foundation)
2008	Social audit / 20m / documentary for AKF (Aga Khan Foundation)
2007	Self Helping Group / 15m / documentary for UN HABITAT
2007	Up to the Parliament / 40m / documentary/ About the life, campaigning and political challenges of three female candidates in the first Afghanistan parliamentary election in history, Afghanistan
2005	Pamir Territory / 38m / documentary / About Ismaili minority people of Pamir, Afghanistan
2005	Drought in Hazarajat / 30m / documentary/ About drought in the Central Highland region of Afghanistan  2004 End of the Earth / 40m / documentary / 40 minutes. About September 11 and Afghan Refugees in European countries
2004	Brown Package, short fiction / 32m / Cinematographer, working with Director Sohaila Jawaheri, Afghanistan
2003	Kite, short fiction / 22m / Cinematographer, working with Director Razi Mohebi, Afghanistan

Documentary series 
1999	Rewayat-e ‒ Hejr / 5 episodes / each 15m / Iran / About Illegal Afghan Refugees in Iran 
	Small Breadwinners  
	Afghan's Village  
	Children of Earth 
	Brickwork 
	Mnqabat Reading 
 
2000	Charaqhaye Rabeta / 5 episodes / each 25m / Iran / Autobiography and life of select Afghan Poets, Writers, Activists and Scientists who live in Iran 
	Poet, Mohammad Kazem Kazemi  
	Poet, Sharif Saeidi 
	Poet, Abutaleb Mozaffari 
	Dr. Esmatullahi  
	Afghan Carving Art  
 
2003	Afghanistan, Heart of Asia / 9 episodes / each 25m / Afghanistan / An investigative reporting documentary series on the seven provinces of Afghanistan after the fall of Taliban; how the provinces look now, the local residents' expectations of assistance from the international community, their daily lives and challenges, and historic and picturesque places to see and visit. 
 
2007	Small City Great Expectations / 6 episodes / each 25m / Afghanistan/ A research documentary series on the following topics to give an image of what is happening in Afghanistan six years after the fall of the Taliban:  
	Women of small cities 
	Religious parties after the fall of Taliban  
	How the education system of Afghanistan works 
	Social services in Kabul city  
	Media and cultural development 
	Job challenges and unemployment

Joined documentary Movies 
2012	/ Mohtarama / documentary / HD / 60m / In 2009, the Afghan Parliament approved Shia Family Law, which was then signed by President Karzai. The law severely restricted women's freedom, making it illegal for them to exit the house without their husbands' consent or to resist their husbands' sexual demands. Mohtarama is mainly about Shia Family Law and the educated Afghan women and their common concerns that range from lack of political and social rights, to domestic violence and troubled married lives, to street harassment; Co-Directed with Diana Saqab.
2010	/ These Three Women / documentary / 20m / about three female Activists of the Independent Administrative Reform and Civil Service Commission of Afghanistan; Co-Directed with Diana Saqab.
2009	/ Run Roobina Run / documentary / DV CAM / 55 Minutes / About Roobina Moqimyar, the first Afghan Athletes in Olympic Games, Run Roobina Run was shot during the Beijing Olympic Games and is now ready to be screened and sent to festivals.
2007	/ Twenty Five Percent / documentary / DV CAM / 37m /Despite the many duties of the six female Afghan Members of Parliament have in their private lives as wives, mothers and daughters, they do attempt to live up to their responsibility for society both within and outside of Parliament, in a traditional and male-dominated environment. Since the women are not acknowledged a position in society, they must first assert it; Co-Directed with Diana Saqab.

Festivals 
For End of the Earth 
2011 International Exile Film Festival, Gothenburg, Sweden 
2009 International Human Rights Film Festival, Manama, Bahrain  
2009 Afghanistan Film Festival, Stockholm, Sweden  
2008 Afghanistan Film Festival, Kraków, Poland
2007 VI International Audiovisual Festival, Baku, Azerbaijan  
2007 International TV Film Festival of Islamic Countries, Isfahan, Iran  
2006 IFCC Film Festival Italy, Matera, Italy 
2006 International Documentary and short Film Festival, Kabul, Afghanistan  
2006 Kazan International Film Festival (Golden Minbar), Kazan, Russia  
2005 Afghanistan Film Festival, Köln, Germany  
2005 Anti War Film Festival, Vancouver, Canada 
 
For Drought in Hazarajat 
2004 Kish International Documentary Film Festival
2005 FICC Film Festival in Italy, broadcast by BBC Persia and other TV stations
 
For Pamir Territory  
2006 Kazan (Russia) International Film Festival (Golden Minbar), Kazan, Russia (Winner)
2006 Berlin Asia Pacific Film Festival, Berlin, Germany 
2006 IFCC Film Festival Italy, Matera, Italy
2007 VI International Audiovisual Festival, Baku, Azerbaijan
2009 International Human Rights Film Festival, Manama, Bahrain 
2008 Guangzhou International Documentary Film Festival, Guangzhou, China  
  
For Up to the Parliament  
2007 Kabul Film Festival, Kabul, Afghanistan
2008 FICC Film Festival, Matera, Italy
 
For Twenty Five Percent  
2008 Mostra International Film Festival, Barcelona, Spain  
2008 Kraków International Film Festival, Kraków, Poland
2009 Bahrain Human Rights Film Festival, Manama, Bahrain
2009 Parwin Etesami International Film Festival, Tehran, Iran 
2009 Special screening for UK, Norway and Swedish Parliamentary Members  
2011 Special screening, University of Tennessee, Knoxville, Tennessee, USA 
BBC Persian 
BBC World News, My Country Program 
 
For Mohtarama 
2013 The International Exile Film Festival, Sweden  
2013 Asiatica Film Festival, Rome, Italy  
2013 Atlanta Philosophy Film Festival  
2013 DMZ Docs, Korea  
2013 Foto Festival, Heidelberg, Germany 
2013 Yamagata International Documentary Film Festival, Japan, Special premiere (Winner) 
2012 Afghanistan Film Festival, Stockholm, Sweden  
2012 Screening in US embassy, Kabul, Afghanistan 
2012 Special screening, ISAF Compound, Kabul, Afghanistan 
2012 Special screening, CDS Duke University, NC, USA  
2012 Special screening, Carolina Friends School, NC, USA  
2012 Special screening, Human Rights Day (10 December) UNAMA, Kabul, Afghanistan 
 
SPECIAL SCREENINGS 
2007 Screening of Malek's three documentaries (End of the Earth, Pamir Territory, and Up to the Parliament), Academy of 
Art, Tehran. Review and discussion of Afghan Cinema 
2006 Screening of Malek's three documentaries (End of the Earth, Pamir Territory, and Up to the Parliament) at the Singapore Film Society and discussion on Afghanistan's challenges

	Self Helping Group / 15m documentary for UN HABITAT / 2007
	3 Documentary for AKF, 2008-2011

Community Member 

1-	International Federation of Film Society / Since 2008 
2-	Documentary Organization of Canada.
3-	Barnaby Art Council.

Festival organizer 
2nd-3rd International Documentary and Short Film Festival Kabul 2007/ 2008
Second Take Film Festival 2008
Afghanistan Human Rights Film Festival 
The AHRF is an international film festival focusing on the subject of human rights. It aims to encourage film makers who use their cameras to document struggles against discrimination, injustice and violence.

The festival is being organised by the Afghanistan Cinema Club with the support of various national and international organizations. It aims to be a hub for film makers and artists working despite of censorship in their countries and whose works are restricted from public screenings.

The AHRF is a platform to share the works of film makers and artists who have unfortunately been marginalized by the authority. It will present stories of lives affected by war, discrimination and injustice. These stories are of people who have resisted oppression and fought against violence to create a more humane world.

AHRF invites entries to the festival. The entries can be documentary, feature film, short film, animation or video art on the subject of human rights. Entry is open to all national and international entrants. There are two categories for entry: national and international.
for more info about AHRFF and Its coming events

Film Festivals jury members 
2017 A Mater of Act Movies That Matter Film Festival Jury 
2013-2016 Burnaby Film Forum 
2011 ADB (Asian Development Bank) Video Competition Judge 
2008	Amnesty Award Jury Member of (CPH:Dox), Copenhagen International Documentary Film Festival CPH:DOX 2008  
2008-2011 Category Judge at BANFF Mountain Film Festival, Banff, Alberta, Canada  
2007 Jury Member of 2nd International Documentary and Short Film Festival, Kabul 
2006 ‒ 2009 Jury Member of Tolo TV Film Festival Tolo TV 
2005 Jury Member of Ayina Film Festival, Kabul

Article 
 سینمای افغانستان
 افغانها در سینمای ایران
 Cinema in Afghanistan

Award 
Best Non-fiction Film Prize for Pamir Territory  MFMK
Best Non-fiction Film Prize for End of the Earth from Kabul Film Festival First

Interview 
ADB Web loge
Time Out interviews the director of a landmark festival of Afghani films which arrives in the city this fortnight
 گامهای نخست سینما
 فيلم ساز واسطهء شفاف ميان بيننده و واقعيت زنده گي مردم است
 مصاحبه اختصاصی با جمهوری سکوت

Sources 
 BASA Film
 Afghanistan International Human Rights Film Festival
 Documentary Organisation of Canada 
 Movies That Matter 

1974 births
Living people
Afghan film directors
Hazara people
Hazara artists
Afghan film producers